Ramgha  is a former village development committee  now changed into MadhyaNepal Municipality in Lamjung District in the Gandaki Zone of northern-central Nepal. According to Geologist Dr.Harka Gurung this area lies in the centroid of Nepal.At the time of the 1991 Nepal census it had a population of 2327 people living in 446 individual households.

References

External links
UN map of the municipalities of Lamjung District

Populated places in Lamjung District